The 1923 Morpeth by-election was a by-election held for the British House of Commons constituency of Morpeth in Northumberland on 21 June 1923.  The seat had become vacant on the death in May 1923 of the constituency's Labour Member of Parliament (MP) John Cairns, who had held the seat since the 1918 general election.

Candidates
Labour selected as its candidate the former leader of the Miners Federation of Great Britain, 66-year old Robert Smillie, a founder of the Independent Labour Party who had stood unsuccessfully at many previous parliamentary elections. Smillie's selection placed many Northumberland miners in a strange position as they had been used to having local miners' candidates to elect to represent them in Cairns and his predecessor, the Liberal Thomas Burt. Smillie on the other hand, was a Scotsman with no links to the local community.

Smillie's only opponent was the Liberal, 50 year-old Newcastle based, Frank Thornborough. Unlike Smillie, he could demonstrate commitment to serving the people of Morpeth. Thornborough had been the Liberal candidate at both the last election, when the Liberals came second and the election of 1918. He was also a politician of some stature, having been Chairman of the National League of Young Liberals.

The Conservative Party had come third in Morpeth at the 1922 general election but did not field a candidate in the by-election. This was expected to help the Liberal campaign as it was thought that many Conservative voters would not vote for a Scottish Socialist. However, for Thornborough to win, he would need to retain his support and pick up virtually all of the Conservative vote to defeat Smillie.

Result
Smillie held the seat comfortably, with a slightly increased majority;

Aftermath
Smillie was re-elected at the general election in December 1923 and again at the 1924 election, but stood down at the 1929 general election due to ill health. Thornborough stood at four other elections, but never entered Parliament.

Morpeth remained a Labour-held constituency until the party split at the 1931 election, when the Conservative Godfrey Nicholson served one term.  Labour's Robert Taylor regained the seat at the 1935 election, and Morpeth elected Labour MPs until the constituency's abolition for the 1983 general election.

See also
 Morpeth (UK Parliament constituency)
 Morpeth, Northumberland
 List of United Kingdom by-elections (1918–1931)

References 

 

Morpeth by-election
Morpeth by-election
Morpeth by-election
20th century in Northumberland
By-elections to the Parliament of the United Kingdom in Northumberland constituencies
Morpeth, Northumberland